1116 Catriona is a carbonaceous asteroid from the outer regions of the asteroid belt, approximately  in diameter. It was discovered on 5 April 1929, by South African astronomer Cyril Jackson at the Union Observatory in Johannesburg. The asteroid was probably named after the 1893-novel Catriona by Robert Louis Stevenson.

Classification and orbit 

Catriona is not a member of any identified asteroid family. It orbits the Sun in the outer main belt at a distance of 2.3–3.6 AU once every 5.00 years (1,826 days). Its orbit has an eccentricity of 0.23 and an inclination of 17° with respect to the ecliptic. The body's observation arc begins with its official discovery observation at Johannesburg.

Naming 

This minor planet was probably named after Catriona, the 1893-novel by Robert Louis Stevenson (1850–1894), who was a Scottish poet, novelist and travel writer. The naming citation is based on Lutz Schmadel's research including feedback from R. Bremer.

Physical characteristics 

Catriona is an assumed carbonaceous C-type asteroid.

Rotation period 

In December 2003, the best-rated rotational lightcurve of Catriona was obtained from photometric observations by American astronomer John Menke at his Menke Observatory in Barnesville, Maryland. Lightcurve analysis gave a well-defined rotation period of 8.83 hours with a notably low brightness variation of 0.09 magnitude, indicative of a spheroidal shape. Additional photometric observations gave a concurring period of 8.832 hours, while others  gave a longer period of 10.49 and 12.06 hours.

Diameter and albedo 

According to observations by astronomers at the Rozhen Observatory in Bulgaria, as well as the surveys carried out by the Infrared Astronomical Satellite IRAS, the Japanese Akari satellite and the NEOWISE mission of NASA's Wide-field Infrared Survey Explorer, Catriona measures between 36.71 and 41.010 kilometers in diameter  and its surface has an albedo between 0.1397 and 0.175.

The Collaborative Asteroid Lightcurve Link derives an albedo of 0.1395 and a diameter of 39.02 kilometers based on an absolute magnitude of 9.8.

Notes

References

External links 
 Lightcurve Database Query (LCDB), at www.minorplanet.info
 Dictionary of Minor Planet Names, Google books
 Asteroids and comets rotation curves, CdR – Geneva Observatory, Raoul Behrend
 Discovery Circumstances: Numbered Minor Planets (1)-(5000) – Minor Planet Center
 
 

001116
Discoveries by Cyril Jackson (astronomer)
Named minor planets
19290405